Jagel is a municipality in the district of Schleswig-Flensburg, in Schleswig-Holstein, Germany.

Jagel is also an older German name for Jogaila.

References

Municipalities in Schleswig-Holstein
Schleswig-Flensburg